Another Time, Another Place EP is Avalon's third EP release. It contains three songs that would be included in Another Time, Another Place: Timeless Christian Classics.

Track listing

Lineup of Members
Jody McBrayer
Janna Long
Melissa Greene
Greg Long

References

Avalon (band) albums
2006 EPs
Sparrow Records EPs